Pinus krempfii, or Krempf's pine, is a rare species of pine, endemic to the central highlands of Vietnam in the Da Lat–Nha Trang area. It is unusual in that it has flat needles. Because of this anomaly, it is put in its own subsection, the Krempfianae.

References

Krempfii
Endemic flora of Vietnam
Trees of Vietnam
Vulnerable flora of Asia